"Eat, Sleep, Rave, Repeat" is a song by Fatboy Slim, Riva Starr and Beardyman. It features vocals from Beardyman who improvised all of the lyrics and vocals in one take. It was released on 20 June 2013. Aided by a remix by Calvin Harris, the song reached number 3 on the UK Singles Chart, becoming Fatboy Slim's first top ten hit since "Star 69" / "Weapon of Choice" in 2001. A remix by Dimitri Vegas & Like Mike and Ummet Ozcan was released on 23 December 2013.

Music video
The lyric video for the original track was released on 24 June 2013. A music video to accompany the release of the Calvin Harris Remix was first released onto YouTube on 22 October 2013.

Track listings

Charts

Weekly charts

Year-end charts

References

2013 songs
2013 singles
Fatboy Slim songs
Number-one singles in Scotland
Songs written by Norman Cook
Spinnin' Records singles
Skint Records singles